Is That a Riot? is an album recorded in 2006 by the Youngblood Brass Band.

Track listing
 "March"
 "Nuclear Summer"
 "Waiver"
 "But You Can't Run"
 "Pala Minima"
 "JEM"
 "Dead Man Stomping"
 "Ake"
 "Is That a Riot?"
 "Bone Refinery"
 "Sell Me More Or Like You Just Don't Care"
 "Will"
 "Thanks"

References

Youngblood Brass Band albums
2006 albums